List of software created and maintained by people other than the manufacturer of the product. The extent of support for (and testing on) particular hardware varies from project to project.

Embedded
Notable custom-firmware projects for wireless routers.
Many of these will run on various brands such as Linksys, Asus, Netgear, etc.

 OpenWrt – Customizable FOSS firmware written from scratch; features a combined SquashFS/JFFS2 file system and the package manager opkg with over 3000 available packages (Linux/GPL); now merged with LEDE.
 LEDE – A fork of the OpenWrt project that shared many of the same goals; merged back into OpenWrt as of v. 18.06 (2018).
 Commotion Wireless – FOSS mesh networking.
 DD-WRT – Based on OpenWrt kernel since v. 23 (Dec. 2005), paid and free versions available.
 Gargoyle – A free OpenWrt-based Linux distribution for a range of Broadcom and Atheros chipset based wireless routers.
 LibreCMC – An FSF-endorsed derivation of OpenWRT with the proprietary blobs removed
 Roofnet – A now defunct experimental 802.11 based mesh network project developed at the MIT Computer Science and Artificial Intelligence Laboratory. The technology developed by the Roofnet project formed the basis for the company Meraki, now owned by Cisco.
 DebWRT – A discontinued project that combines the Linux kernel from OpenWrt and the package management system from Debian (Linux/GPL).
 HyperWRT – Early power-boosting firmware project to stay close to the official WRT54G and WRT54GS firmware but add features such as transmit power, port triggers, scripts, telnet, etc.
 Tomato – The successor to HyperWRT, features advanced QoS as well as Ajax and SVG graphs.
Asuswrt
Asuswrt-Merlin

Other
Software distributions for routers with >5 GB Storage and >1 GB RAM

FreeBSD
 m0n0wall - m0n0wall is abandoned, but it was built on FreeBSD and boots off of flash storage or CD ROM media in under 12 megabytes.
 pfsense - an open source firewall/router computer software distribution based on FreeBSD that can be installed on a physical computer or a virtual machine.
 OPNsense - a fork of pfSense.

Linux
 Zeroshell – Routers and bridges with VPN, QoS, load balancing and other functions
 IPFire - Advanced firmware written from scratch with customizable firewall and optional packages in the form of add ons.
 TNSR - Router software from Netgate (originally based on CentOS Linux, however recent versions are based on Ubuntu Linux) that incorporates Vector Packet Processing, Data Plane Development Kit, FRRouting, and Clixon technologies.
 VyOS - Open source network operating system based on Debian Linux.

See also
 List of router and firewall distributions
 Comparison of router software projects

References

Further reading
 

Embedded Linux
Free software lists and comparisons
Free software projects
Free routing software
Firmware projects
Linux-based devices
Firmware projects
FreeBSD